The Steel-Maitland, later Ramsay-Steel-Maitland Baronetcy, of Sauchie in the County of Stirling, was a title in the Baronetage of the United Kingdom. It was created on 30 March 1935 for the Conservative politician Arthur Steel-Maitland. The title was inherited successively by his two sons and became extinct on the death of the third Baronet in 1965.

Steel-Maitland, later Ramsay-Steel-Maitland baronets, of Sauchie (1917)
Sir Arthur Herbert Drummond Ramsay Steel-Maitland, 1st Baronet (1876–1935)
Sir Arthur James Drummond Ramsay-Steel-Maitland, 2nd Baronet (1902–1960)
Sir Keith Richard Felix Ramsay-Steel-Maitland, 3rd Baronet (1912–1965)

References

1925 establishments in the United Kingdom
Extinct baronetcies in the Baronetage of the United Kingdom